The 2012 Ricoh Women's British Open was held 13–16 September at Royal Liverpool Golf Club in Merseyside, England. It was the 36th Women's British Open, and the 12th as a major championship on the LPGA Tour. It was scheduled later in the year due to the 2012 Summer Olympics in London. Jiyai Shin won her second Women's British Open, nine strokes ahead of runner-up Inbee Park.

Weather was a factor, as the second round on Friday was halted before 8:30 a.m. due to high winds. The scores were thrown out and the round was restarted on Saturday, with the final two rounds played on Sunday.

Exemptions and qualifying events
The field for the tournament was 144, and golfers gained a place in three ways. Most players earn exemptions based on good past performances on the Ladies European Tour, the LPGA Tour and in previous major championships and top-ranked players in the Women's World Golf Rankings. The rest of the field earned entry by successfully competing in qualifying tournaments open to any professional female golfer or amateur with a low handicap. The final qualifying tournament was held at Caldy Golf Club just up the road from the famous links.

There were 15 exemption categories for the 2012 Women's British Open. These are:

The top 30 finishers (and ties) from the 2011 Women's British Open.
The top 10 Ladies European Tour members in the Women's World Golf Rankings who did not finish in the top 30 of the 2011 Women's British Open.
The top 30 LPGA Tour members in the Women's World Golf Rankings who did not finish in the top 30 of the 2011 Women's British Open.
The top 25 on the current LET money list not already exempt from the 2011 Women's British Open or the world rankings.
The top 40 on the current LPGA Tour money list not already exempt from the 2011 Women's British Open or the world rankings.
The top five on the current LPGA of Japan Tour money list not already exempt from the 2011 Women's British Open or through the world rankings if they are also members of the LET or LPGA. (Note that these six categories will account for approximately 125 entries — or 5/6ths of the players in the final field.)
Winners of any recognised LET or LPGA Tour events in the calendar year 2012.
Winners of the 2011 LET, LPGA, JLPGA and KLPGA money lists.
Winners of the last 10 editions of the Women's British Open.
Winners of the last five editions of one of the other three LPGA majors.
Winner of the 2011 Japan LPGA Tour Championship Ricoh Cup.
The leading five LPGA Tour members upon completion of 36 holes in the 2012 Jamie Farr Toledo Classic who have entered the Championship and who are not otherwise exempt.
The leading 3 LET members in the 2012 ISPS Handa Ladies British Masters, who have entered the Championship and who are not otherwise exempt.
The 2012 British Ladies Amateur champion, 2011 Ladies' British Open Amateur Stroke Play champion, 2011 U.S. Women's Amateur champion and 2011 European Ladies' Amateur champion, provided they are still amateurs at the time of the Championship and a maximum of two other leading amateurs at the discretion of the Ladies’ Golf Union.
Any players granted special exemptions from qualifying by the Championship Committee.

Past champions in the field

Made the cut

Missed the cut

Course

Both layouts started on club hole #17 (Royal) and ended at the par-5 #16 (Dun).

Round summaries

First round
Thursday, 13 September 2012

Source:

Second round
Saturday, 15 September 2012

Play was stopped at 8:25 a.m. and did not resume; all scores for the day were declared null and void and were scrapped. The second round was restarted on Saturday morning, with the third and fourth rounds both scheduled for Sunday off of split tees, as the Monday forecast was for weather similar to Friday's. In order to complete the final 36 holes on Sunday in the reduced daylight of mid-September, the cut was reduced by fifteen players, to the top fifty and ties. Professionals within the top 65 and ties earned official prize money.

Source:

Amateurs: Ko (−1), Clyburn (+1), Law (+2), Yan (+5), Hull (+7), Taylor (+7), Peters (+9), Boulden (+10), Maguire (+13), Thompson (+14).

Third round
Sunday, 16 September 2012 (morning)

Source:

Final round
Sunday, 16 September 2012 (afternoon)

Source:

Amateurs: Ko (+9), Clyburn (+11), Law (+12), Yan (+16).

Scorecard
Final round

Cumulative tournament scores, relative to par
{|class="wikitable" span = 50 style="font-size:85%;
|-
|style="background: Red;" width=10|
|Eagle
|style="background: Pink;" width=10|
|Birdie
|style="background: PaleGreen;" width=10|
|Bogey
|style="background: Green;" width=10|
|Double bogey
|style="background: Olive;" width=10|
|Triple bogey+
|}

References

External links

LPGA.com - Women's British Open - microsite
Ladies Golf Union: Women's British Open
Ladies European Tour: 2012 Ricoh Women's British Open

Women's British Open
Golf tournaments in England
British Open
Women's British Open
Women's British Open
2010s in Merseyside